Illinois Route 78 is a major north–south highway in western Illinois. It runs from  Illinois Route 104 northwest of Jacksonville north to Highway 78 at the Wisconsin state line north of Warren.

Route description

Jacksonville to Elmwood
Starting from IL 104 in Jacksonville, IL 78 briefly travels east, then south, and then east again. Then, it turns north via Main Street, passing the Jacksonville Municipal Airport. As it continues north, it then reaches IL 125 in Virginia. In Havana, US 136, as well as IL 97, begins to run concurrently with IL 78. US 136 then leaves the concurrency just west of the Scott W. Lucas Bridge. At the US 24 junction, IL 97 branches off west via US 24 while IL 78 travels east via US 24. In Little America, IL 78 branches off north from US 24. Then, IL 9 runs concurrently with IL 78 in Canton. In Farmington, IL 78 turns east via IL 116 and then back north again; branching off north from IL 116. In Elmwood, it follows IL 8 east and then north before branching off north.

Elmwood to Wisconsin state line

Further north, IL 78 then crosses under I-74 without a direct interchange. It then turns east and then north again. After that, it then intersects IL 90 north of Laura, then briefly runs concurrently with IL 17, then with US 34, and then intersects with IL 91. In Kewanee, US 34 then branches off northeast. North of the junction, IL 81 ends at the intersection with IL 78. In Annawan, it crosses US 6 and then I-80 at a diamond interchange. Further north, IL 78 then runs concurrently with IL 92, then meets I-88/IL 110 (CKC) at a diamond interchange, and then runs concurrently with US 30 in Morrison. IL 40 ends at an intersection south of Mount Carroll. In Mount Carroll, it intersects US 52/IL 64. Further north, in Stockton, IL 78 then runs concurrently with US 20. In Warren, it then turns northwest before reaching the Wisconsin state line. At that point, IL 78 becomes WIS 78.

History
Starting in 1929, IL 78 first appeared as segments while the rest were under construction. Within a few years, most of IL 78 from Jacksonville to Warren was finished. In 1935, IL 78 superseded portions of IL 82, IL 3, and IL 40. However, a section between Jacksonville and Virginia became part of US 67. By the late 1930s, a portion of IL 78 was moved onto a more direct route between Maples Mill and West Havana. It remained like that until 1968 when US 67 rerouted away from Virginia. This resulted in the extension of IL 78 from Virginia to Jacksonville.

Points of interest
The following historic and geographic sites can be enjoyed on Illinois Route 78, traveling from south to north:

 Jim Edgar Panther Creek State Fish and Wildlife Area
 Emiquon Project
 Dickson Mounds
 Snakeden Hollow State Fish and Wildlife Area
 Johnson-Sauk Trail State Park
 Prophetstown State Recreation Area
 Morrison-Rockwood State Park
 Apple River Canyon State Park

Major intersections

References

External links

 Illinois Highway Ends: Illinois Route 78

078
Transportation in Morgan County, Illinois
Transportation in Cass County, Illinois
Transportation in Mason County, Illinois
Transportation in Fulton County, Illinois
Transportation in Knox County, Illinois
Transportation in Peoria County, Illinois
Transportation in Stark County, Illinois
Transportation in Henry County, Illinois
Transportation in Whiteside County, Illinois
Transportation in Carroll County, Illinois
Transportation in Jo Daviess County, Illinois
U.S. Route 67